Ochicanthon cingalensis, is a species of dung beetle found in Sri Lanka.

Description 
This small oval species has an average length of about 4.5 mm. Its body is reddish-brown. The head has fine, even punctures. Laterally, the pronotum is weakly convex. Elytra are moderately convex with well-marked, narrow striae. Pygidium are smooth, except for few minute punctures at the sides. Metasternal shield also impunctate.

References 

Scarabaeinae
Insects of Sri Lanka
Insects described in 1931